Trigger Point is a 2022 British crime thriller television series starring Vicky McClure as a police bomb disposal expert in London. It is created and written by Daniel Brierley. It was first broadcast on 23 January 2022 on ITV. On 27 February 2022, it was announced that a second series was commissioned.

Plot
Lana Washington is an ex-military bomb disposal operative (known as an 'Expo') and Afghan War veteran who heads a Metropolitan Police bomb squad, using her skills to counter the terrorist threat.

Cast
Vicky McClure as Lana Washington
Adrian Lester as Joel Nutkins
Tom Stokes as Pete
Gavin Sibson as PS Costa
Cal MacAninch as Inspector Lee Robins
Gwynfor Jones as PS Brown
Mark Stanley as DI Thom Youngblood
Manjinder Virk as DI Samira Desai
Eric Shango as Danny
Ralph Ineson as Commander Bregman
Warren Brown as Karl Maguire
Kerry Godliman as Sonia Reeves
Nabil Elouahabi as Hassan Rahim
Nadine Marshall as DSU Marianne Hamilton
Kris Hitchen as John Hudson
Ewan Mitchell as Billy Washington
Michael Akinsulire as PS Carney 
Lucy Russell as Moira Bloxham
Salima Saxton as Ayesha Campbell-Khan
Rick Warden as Andy Phelan
Kevin Eldon as Jeff Washington
Tamzin Griffin as Val Washington
Neil Stoddart as Nick Roberts
Camilla Power as Agatha Jack
Jennifer Castle as Jocasta Wellings 
Mo Idriss as Ali Hussein

Production
Mercurio mentored Brierly, who was new to television, and developed the series during a television bursary scheme. The series was filmed in London.

Episodes

Release 
The series first premiered in the UK on ITV on January 22, 2022. In June 2022, it was announced that NBC Universal's Peacock streaming platform had picked up the series for US streaming starting on July 8, 2022.

Reception
Lucy Mangan  for The Guardian gave the first episode three out of five stars, remarking, 'It's great fun as long as you set your preposterousness levels to “high”. Go in thinking CSI: Peckham or Line of Bomb Duty or Bomby McBombface, rather than The Wire But With Actual Wires or Breaking Explosively Badly and you'll enjoy yourself a lot more.' Ed Cumming of The Independent also gave it three out five stars, praising the tension but finding the dialogue and storytelling melodramatic.

Accolades

References

External links 
 

2022 British television series debuts
2020s British crime television series
Crime thriller television series
English-language television shows
ITV crime shows
Television series by Hat Trick Productions
Television shows set in London